The Baskerville Apartment Building is an early apartment constructed in 1913 in Madison, Wisconsin, two blocks south of the capitol. In 1988 it was added to the National Register of Historic Places.

History
Around 1900, the population of Madison was growing rapidly, driven by expansion of the University, government, and industry. Many people couldn't drive in to work from outside the downtown because automobiles weren't yet common. Around 1910, to meet the growing need for housing downtown, developers began to build small apartment buildings. By building up, an apartment building could house many families in the same footprint as one or two single-family homes. This boom in apartment building continued through 1930.

Built in 1913-14, the Baskerville falls early in this boom, and it is rather large among the early apartment buildings. It was designed by Madison architect Richard L. Wright to fit the wedge-shaped parcel where S. Hamilton St meets W. Doty. The building stands four stories tall on a raised, red brick foundation. Exterior walls are tan brick, topped with a simple Neoclassical-styled cornice. A section of each street-facing side is recessed to make space for balconies with iron balustrades. In one of these recesses is the main entrance - double-doors with sidelights and transom, framed in concrete with "The Baskerville" inscribed above.

Inside is a vestibule paneled in marble. Common areas beyond that include woodwork stained dark and a few decorative columns. Each floor contained six apartments. Most of the apartments included a living room, a bedroom, a galley kitchen, and a bathroom. Dimensions and shapes varied somewhat to fit into the building's triangular shell. The basement originally held two flats, a storage room, a boiler room, and a laundry. The building cost about $50,000 to build.

Robert Wright had worked for Gordon & Paunack and Claude & Starck of Madison. In 1909 he started his own architecture practice. Surviving buildings from before the Baskerville are the 1909 Prairie Style City Market, the 1912 Prairie-style bungalows at 405 Sidney St and 406 Sidney St, After the Baskerville are the 1914 Prairie School Harley house at 1909 Vilas Ave and the 1916 Haseltine bungalow at 18 Jane St. in Mazomanie. 
 
In addition to the NRHP listing, the Baskerville was also designated a landmark by the Madison Landmarks Commission in 1992 and is listed on the Wisconsin State Register of Historic Places. The building is now a condominium community.

References

Buildings and structures in Madison, Wisconsin
Neoclassical architecture in Wisconsin
Residential buildings completed in 1914
Residential buildings on the National Register of Historic Places in Wisconsin
Residential condominiums in the United States
National Register of Historic Places in Madison, Wisconsin

Further reading
 Wright's floorplans for the apartments are copied at the end of the NRHP nomination in the references above, if you're interested in that sort of thing.